Schöner is a German surname, also rendered as Schoener, Shoener, or Schoner 

 Johannes Schöner, also Johann(es) Schonerus (1477–1547), German mathematician, geographer, cartographer, astronomer
 Johannes Schöner globe
 George Schoener
 Rosa 'Schoener's Nutkana'
 Christoph Schoener (born 1953), German church musician
 Eberhard Schoener (born 1938), German musician and composer
 Marion Schöner
 Martin Schöner (d. 1611), German physician to James VI and I of England and Anna of Denmark
 Ingeborg Schöner (born 1935), German actress
 Herbert Schoner (died 1971 in Kaiserslautern), German policeman, second victim of RAF terrorism
 The Schoeners

See also 
 Schön
 Schönerer

German-language surnames
Surnames from nicknames